The Hutt River (or ; officially Te Awa Kairangi / Hutt River) flows through the southern North Island of New Zealand.

The Hutt River Trail, a regional park administered by Wellington Regional Council, runs alongside the eastern side of the river.

Toponymy

Early Māori residents, such as Ngāi Tara, called the river Te Awa Kairangi. Later Māori settlers named it Te Wai o Orutu after Orutu, a Ngāti Mamoe ancestor. By the time European settlers arrived, Māori called it Heretaunga, a name adopted by an Upper Hutt suburb and secondary school.

The river was named Hutt after Sir William Hutt, chairman of the New Zealand Company. This name was given by Captain Edward Main Chaffers and Colonel William Wakefield while charting Port Nicholson in 1839. The official name since 2011 is Te Awa Kairangi / Hutt River.

Geography

For most of its length, the Hutt is a shallow and sometimes braided river in a wide rocky bed, but in the Kaitoke gorge the river flows directly over bedrock, and approaching the mouth at Petone the river is narrower and the banks steeper. The larger populated areas in Upper Hutt and Lower Hutt are protected from flooding by stopbanks and introduced willow trees, as is common in New Zealand.

The headwaters in the Kaitoke Regional Park are closed to preserve the quality of the drinking water drawn off at Kaitoke to supply the greater Wellington area. Below Kaitoke is the Kaitoke Gorge, a popular destination for rafting. Below the gorge is Te Mārua, where the Mangaroa River joins the Hutt from the east.

Further down, at Birchville, the Akatarawa River joins the Hutt from the west. Here it flows in a deep channel between the surrounding hills and is turned to flow across the Wellington Fault to Maoribank. The movement of the fault can be seen from the displacement of the river terraces in Harcourt Park.

At the top of the Upper Hutt floodplain, the river makes a sharp turn against the bedrock at the foot of the cliff at Maoribank to flow down the valley. The Upper Hutt floodplain contains the greater portion of Upper Hutt city. The Whakatiki River joins the Hutt from the west and it is about this point the river starts to flow along the virtually straight Wellington geologic fault, which lies on the western side of the river valley.

At the lower end of the Upper Hutt floodplain is Taita Gorge, which separates Upper Hutt from Lower Hutt; this gorge is significantly shorter and less constricting than Kaitoke Gorge. The river's outflow, at Petone, is into Wellington Harbour. The geological fault that the river previously followed continues as a steep bluff at the edge of the Wellington Harbour.

State Highway 2 follows the course of the river for most of its length, with the exception of the Kaitoke Gorge and the head waters, before crossing the Remutaka Range into the Wairarapa.

History

The Hutt has moved significantly since European settlement, due to a major earthquake in 1855 that raised the riverbed.

The regular flooding of Lower Hutt resulted in highly fertile land and prior to the building of state housing by the first Labour Government starting in 1937, there were many market gardens in Lower Hutt.

Well-established foot tracks along the river were formally signposted in the 1990s, through a collaboration between Wellington Regional Council, local Rotary International clubs, Hutt City Council, Upper Hutt City Council and other groups.

Recreation

The Hutt River Trail, a 29 kilometre cycling and walking route, follows the entire length of the river from Petone to Kaitoke Regional Park at Upper Hutt, linking up to Kaitoke Regional Park. Most of the track is gravel, but some is sealed or grass. Some low-lying parts of the track can be affected by flooding.

There are several spots for swimming, fishing and kayaking. The trail includes some filming locations for the Lord of the Rings film franchise.

The Lower Hutt Parkrun runs along the last  section of the Hutt River from just north of the Ewen Bridge down to the Waione Bridge and back.

Ecology
The river has a good stock of brown trout.

Bridges

Heading downstream:
Kaitoke Swingbridges, two footbridges in Kaitoke Regional Park.
Te Mārua Bridgem a demolished bridge.
Akatarawa Road Bridge, a two-lane road bridge opened in 1981 to replace a single-lane road bridge opened in 1915 and demolished in 1982. Abutments of the old bridge remain in the adjacent downstream riverbank and a pier footing remains in the river bed.
Akatarawa Bridge, the old Hutt County Council wooden truss bridge that crossed the river near the intersection of Rata Street and Birch Terrace with Akatarawa Road. The bridge was constructed in 1880-81 and closed in 1953. Piers were damaged by flooding and then demolished and removed from riverbed in 1998.
Hutt Borough Council Pipe Bridge was constructed adjacent to the Akatarawa Bridge in 1913 to carry the Hutt Borough Council water supply pipes until decommissioned in 1958. It was damaged by flooding, and demolished in 1998 at the same time as the Akatarawa Bridge.
Norbert Street Footbridge between California Park in Totara Park and Harcourt Park at the end of Norbert Street in Birchville.
Maoribank Suspension Bridge was built in 1917, crossing at the bend in the river at the foot of Maoribank Cliff. The bridge was demolished in 1998, after the cliffside pier was damaged by flooding, making the bridge unsafe.
Totara Park Bridge (Totara Park Road), a two-lane road bridge, opened about 1970 and provides access to the suburb of Totara Park.
Moonshine Bridge (River Road/SH 2), a curved two-lane road bridge, was opened in 1987 as part of the River Road bypass of Upper Hutt. It replaced a road bridge slightly upstream of the current bridge.
Silverstream Road Bridge (Fergusson Drive), a two-lane road bridge, carries a bulk water supply pipe, underslung on the north side, connecting Te Mārua water treatment plant with Porirua and Wellington City.
Silverstream Rail Bridge (Wairarapa Line), a double-track rail bridge, opened in 1954 to replace the 1875 single-track rail bridge around 500 metres further downstream.
Pomare Rail Bridge (Wairarapa Line), a double-track rail bridge, opened in 1954 as part of the Hutt Valley railway deviation.
Kennedy-Good Bridge (Fairway Drive), a two-lane road bridge, opened in 1979 and was the first bridge at this site. The bridge is named after the Mayor of Lower Hutt at the time.
Melling Bridge (Melling Link Road), a three-lane bridge opened 1957, with one eastbound lane and two westbound lanes. This is the second bridge at this site, the first being a one-lane suspension bridge opened in 1909, approximately 200 metres upstream.
New Ewen Bridge is a single span arch bridge carrying four traffic lanes of traffic and footways. It is the seventh bridge at this site and was opened in 1996. The preceding bridges, which crossed nearer to Bridge Street, upstream of the latest bridge, were opened in 1844, 1847, 1856, 1872, 1904 and 1929.
The Rail Bridge (Wairarapa Line) is a two-track rail bridge with pedestrian walkway. It was opened o 1927 with the then Hutt Valley Line to Waterloo.
Estuary Bridge (Waione Street) is a two-lane road bridge opened in 1954, that carries a bulk water supply pipe connecting Waterloo and Wainuiomata water treatment plants with Wellington City.

References

External links 

Lower Hutt
Upper Hutt
Rivers of the Wellington Region
Rivers of New Zealand
Regional parks of New Zealand
Hutt Valley